Sport Relief's Top Dog is a British BBC Two game show hosted by Gaby Roslin. The first series began airing on 3 March 2014 and ended on 21 March 2014.

The series consisted of 15 episodes aired over three consecutive weeks in the run up to Sport Relief 2014. The show saw celebrities and their dogs lead a team consisting of two other dogs and their owners battle it out in a series of challenges to claim the title of 'Top Dog 2014'. The winners of the first series were Gail Emms with her Westie Raffa and their team.

Production
The series was recorded at The Maidstone Studios in Kent from 26 January to 1 February 2014.

Episode guide

The winning team is indicated in the Gold box
The celebrity team captain is indicated in Bold

Games

Qualifying for the semi-finals
The fastest four teams from "The Bark Off" were invited back for the semi-final rounds of the show which were aired on 19–20 March 2014.

References

External links

Sport Relief 2014
Sport Relief at Red Nose Day 2014

2014 British television series debuts
2014 British television series endings
BBC Television shows
Sport Relief
English-language television shows